Scream It Like You Mean It was an annual tour put on by founders and owners Dave Shapiro of Los-Angeles-based The Agency Group Ltd. and Matthew Stewart of Washington, D.C.-based Outerloop Management. Yogi Allgood was also a founder, owner, and creator of this tour from 2010 to 2013, but has since left Outerloop. Stewart also left in January 2014.

The national tour throughout 2010-2011 reached the United States and Europe, and 2012-2013 reached throughout the United States. According to co-owner Stewart, "the whole point of this tour and the reason we're doing this for the third straight year is because we try our hardest to make [the tour] a positive experience for both the fans and the artists on it." Stewart also mentioned that "in 2012 or 2013 we’d like to have the tour in the US, Europe, and Australia. We’d like to make it a world brand."

2010 
The first tour featured eight main bands playing 26 shows, during July and August. Electric Zombie and MerchNow were sponsors.

Bands 
Silverstein
Emery
We Came as Romans
Dance Gavin Dance
I Set My Friends on Fire
Sky Eats Airplane
Ivoryline
Close to Home

2011 Europe 
The second tour featured four main bands playing 21 shows, during April and May. Avocado Booking and Outerloop Management were sponsors.

Bands 
We Came as Romans
Miss May I
The Word Alive
This or the Apocalypse

2011 US 
The third tour featured six bands playing 37 shows, during July and August. Music Skins and MerchNow sponsored the tour.

Bands 
Breathe Carolina
Chiodos
I See Stars
The Color Morale
ModSun
The Air I Breathe

2012 
The fourth tour featured 18 bands, reaching 49 cities over five and a half weeks (July 5 through August 12), and featured two stages; however, the tour was divided into two separate tours (entitled Blue or Red) which criss-crossed each other at multiple dates (entitled Gold). The Blue tour headliner was The Acacia Strain, and the Red tour headliner was Attack Attack!. MerchNow and LA GEAR sponsored the tour. Due to the closing of the venue Sonar in Baltimore, MD, the tour's last date was August 11, 2012 at Empire in Springfield, VA (Blue tour).

Bands 
Attack Attack!
We Came as Romans
The Acacia Strain
Woe, Is Me
Abandon All Ships
Oceano
Impending Doom
The Chariot
Texas in July
Like Moths To Flames
In Fear and Faith
For All Those Sleeping
Close to Home
Volumes
Secrets
Hands Like Houses
Glass Cloud
At the Skylines

2013 
The fifth tour featured seven bands, reaching 27 cities and dates during October and ending on November 5, 2013 in New York City. The lineup was heavily criticized for the smaller number of bands.

Bands 
Story of the Year
Like Moths to Flames
Hawthorne Heights
Capture the Crown
Set It Off
Sienna Skies
I Am King
Silverstein (select dates)

Capture the Crown dropped off the tour in late October due to mechanical problems with their transportation.

Due to issues with attendance, a 2014 tour was not set up. It was unclear whether the tour would be back in 2015; as of March 2016 nothing had been announced.

References

American post-hardcore musical groups
Music festivals established in 2010
Heavy metal festivals